Arrow notation may refer to:
Conway chained arrow notation
Knuth's up-arrow notation
Arrow notation (Ramsey theory), or infinitary combinatorics
Arrow notation as a way of representing functions